Miguel Paz Barahona (3 September 1863 – 11 November 1937) was President of Honduras from 1 February 1925 to 1 February 1929.  Barahona was a member of the National Party of Honduras (PNH).

The PNH nominated Barahona as their presidential candidate in 1924.  The other major political party,  the Liberal Party of Honduras (PLH), refused to nominate a candidate, which led to Barahona winning the election with 99 percent of the vote.  He was succeeded in 1929 by Vicente Mejía Colindres of the PLH, following elections which saw an almost unprecedented peaceful transfer of power from one party to another. His presidency marked the beginning of comparative stability in Honduras that lasted for three decades, following the upheavals of the first quarter of the century.

He was the President of National Congress of Honduras from 1933 to 1934.

The Miguel Paz Barahona Elementary School is named after him.

References

 Angelfire
 Honduras Educacional

1863 births
1937 deaths
People from Santa Bárbara Department, Honduras
Honduran people of Spanish descent
National Party of Honduras politicians
Presidents of Honduras
Presidents of the National Congress of Honduras
Universidad de San Carlos de Guatemala alumni